Paullinia navicularis is a species of plant in the family Sapindaceae. It is endemic to Ecuador.

References

Endemic flora of Ecuador
navicularis
Vulnerable plants
Taxonomy articles created by Polbot